Ryan Howison (born December 26, 1966) is a former American professional golfer who played on the PGA Tour and the Nationwide Tour from 1995 to 2008.

Howison earned his PGA Tour card through qualifying school in 1994. He split time between the PGA Tour and the Nationwide Tour (now Korn Ferry Tour) in 1995. He played on the Nationwide Tour from 1996 to 1999 and picked up three victories. He won the Nike Lakeland Classic in 1997 and in 1999 he won the Nike Lakeland Classic again and the Nike Ozarks Open en route to a 10th-place finish on the money list, earning him his PGA Tour card for 2000. He returned to the Nationwide Tour in 2001 where he would play until 2008.

Howison played baseball, not golf, at the University of North Carolina at Chapel Hill, where he was the starting third baseman for the 1989 College World Series team. After two rotator cuff surgeries his junior year, Howison began to pursue golf.

Howison started as a financial advisor in Palm Beach Gardens, Florida in 2009. His business name is OnCourse Wealth Management.

Professional wins (3)

Nike Tour wins (3)

Nike Tour playoff record (1–3)

See also
1994 PGA Tour Qualifying School graduates
1999 Nike Tour graduates

References

External links

American male golfers
PGA Tour golfers
Korn Ferry Tour graduates
Golfers from Columbus, Ohio
North Carolina Tar Heels baseball players
1966 births
Living people